Hampden Academy is a public high school located at 89 Western Avenue in Hampden, Maine, United States. The school is a part of Regional School Unit #22 (R.S.U. 22), with approximately 708 students from Hampden, Newburgh, Frankfort and Winterport attending grades 9–12. It has been accredited by the New England Association of Schools and Colleges.

The school mascot is the Bronco.

History

Hampden Academy was founded in 1803. It became a member of SAD 22 in 1969 (changed to RSU 22 in 2013). It still serves as a public school that educates students from Hampden, Winterport, Frankfort, and Newburgh. The original Hampden Academy building, located across US 1A and now part of the McGraw School, is on the National Register of Historic Places. A new $51.6 million building, located behind the FieldTurf complex, was completed in 2012.

The front lawn of the 1 Main Road North location was the site of the Battle of Hampden during the War of 1812.

Notable alumni
Hiram Batchelder, Civil War soldier and Mayor of Chico, California
Dillon Bates, former member of the Maine House of Representatives
Mike Bordick, baseball player
Ricky Craven, NASCAR driver, ESPN correspondent
Matthew Gagnon, think tank executive, writer and radio host
Jeffrey Hjelm, Maine Supreme Court Justice
Cyrus Hamlin, Civil War General and Politician
Stephen King, author (King was an English teacher at Hampden Academy)
Frederick Low, Member of the U.S. House of Representatives in California and later governor of California
Lewis Mayo, Minnesota state senator
Tanya Ryno (Tanya Grondin 1988), Saturday Night Live producer
Jim Spohrer (1974), computer programmer
Charles Stetson, Member of the U.S. House of Representatives from Maine's 6th district
Michael Thibodeau (1984), Maine State Senate President

References

External links
 

Educational institutions established in 1803
Public high schools in Maine
Schools in Penobscot County, Maine
Hampden, Maine
1803 establishments in Maine